John Pyjon (fl. 1350s), of Shaftesbury, Dorset, was an English Member of Parliament.

He was the uncle of Roger Pyjon.

He was a Member (MP) of the Parliament of England for Shaftesbury in the 1350s.

References

Year of birth missing
Year of death missing
English MPs 1354
People from Shaftesbury